Bad Sister is the debut album by Roxanne Shanté, released in 1989 on Cold Chillin' Records. The album peaked at No. 52 on the Top R&B/Hip-Hop Albums chart.

Production
Bad Sister was produced by Marley Marl. Big Daddy Kane contributed lyrics to a couple of the album's songs.

Critical reception
The New York Times wrote that the songs "combine humor and raw rhythmic power with Ms. Shante's sturdy sense of identity ... [they] proves she's tougher and wittier than the competition." Trouser Press thought that "Shanté has a cute, coy voice that takes on an authoritative edge when she kicks into high gear." The Spin Alternative Record Guide called Bad Sister "a true hip-hop masterpiece" and a "definitive Cold Chillin' album." USA Today praised the "hilarious, sometimes risque stories."

Track listing
"Bad Sister" (D. Clear, M. Williams)—5:00  
"Live on Stage" (N. Wilson, M. Williams)—6:57  
"Independent Woman" (D. Clear, M. Williams)—4:35  
"Knockin' Hiney" (L. Gooden, C. Curry, K. Coaxum, M. Williams)—3:36  
"My Groove Gets Better" (K. Coaxum, M. Williams)—3:30  
"Feelin' Kinda Horny" (J. Loving, P. Bourke)—4:10  
"Have a Nice Day" (remix) (A. Hardy, M. Williams)—3:21  
"Let's Rock, Y'all" (L. Gooden, M. Williams)—4:17  
"Fatal Attraction" (D. Clear, M. Williams)—4:28  
"Wack Itt (Remix)" (L. Gooden, M. Williams, A. Booth)—6:00  
"Skeezer" (A. Hardy, M. Williams)—2:45  
"What's on Your Mind" (R. Diggs Hamlian, M. Williams)—3:20  
"Go on, Girl (Remix)" (A. Hardy, M. Williams)—5:01  
"Gotta Get Paid" (featuring Craig G) (L. Gooden, M. Williams)—1:52

Personnel
 Producer: Marley Marl except "Feelin' Kinda Horny" produced by Jae Supreme & Q. Neighbor
 Mixing: Marley Marl except "Feelin' Kinda Horny" mixed by Jae Supreme & Q. Neighbor
 Assistant engineers: Leon Lee, Thomas on Time, and Clash
 Engineer: Jae Supreme and Richard Joseph on "Feelin' Kinda Horny"
 Remixing: C.J. Mackintosh and David Dorrell on "Live on Stage"
 Art Direction and Design: JoDee Stringham
 Photography: George DuBose
 Album Coordinator: Kelly Haley

Charts

References

1989 debut albums
Roxanne Shanté albums
Albums produced by Marley Marl
Cold Chillin' Records albums
A&M Records albums